is a town located in south-central Saga Prefecture, Japan, in Kishima District. It is known for its vast reclaimed land and tidal flats of the Ariake Sea.

As of October 1, 2016, the town has an estimated population of 23,606.

On January 1, 2005 Shiroshi absorbed the towns of Fukudomi and Ariake, all from Kishima District, to become the new and expanded town of Shiroshi.

Geography

Terrain 
Located in the Saga plains, Shiroishi is bordered by the Ariake Sea to the southeast. The port of Suminoe Bay, in the mouth of the Rokkaku River, has the largest tidal range in Japan with a maximum of about 6m at spring tide.

 Mountains: Mt. Kishima (345m), Mt. Inuyama (342m), Mt. Shiraiwa (340m), Mt. Iimori (318m)
 Rivers: Rokkaku River, Shioda River, Marie River, Tadae River
 Lakes: Nuinoike, Kasegawaike
 85% of the total area of cultivated land is farmland.

Climate
Annual Mean Air Temperature: 
Annual Mean Precipitation: about

Adjoining Cities and Municipalities
Kashima
Takeo
Ureshino
Ōmachi
Kōhoku
Ogi

History
April 1, 1889 - The modern municipal system is established. At this time Shiroishi consists of nine separate villages: Hashishita, Fukudomi, Fukuji, Kinkō, Kita-Ariake, Minami-Ariake, Rokkaku, Ryūō, and Suko.
April 1, 1936 - Fukuji gains town status and is renamed Shiroishi.
April 1, 1955 - Kinkō and Ryūō merge to form Ariake.
July 20, 1955 - Rokkaku and Suko are incorporated into Shiroishi.
September 30, 1955 - Minami-Ariake is incorporated into Ariake.
July 1, 1956 - Kita-Ariake is incorporated into Shiroishi.
October 1, 1962 - Ariake gains town status.
April 1, 1967 - Fukudomi gains town status.
January 1, 2005 - The towns of Shiroishi, Fukudomi, and Ariake are merged under the name Shiroishi.

Demographics
27.01% of the population (7,437) are 65 or older. In 2005 there were 183 births and 322 deaths, 624 immigrants and 805 emigrants, indicating a negative population growth.

Economy

Agriculture
Shiroishi is a very agricultural community. Some of their agricultural products include tempe, renkon, strawberries, onions, rice, and beef.

Education

High schools
(prefectural)
Shiroishi High School
Saga Agricultural School

Junior high schools
Shiroishi Junior High School
Fukudomi Junior High School
Ariake Junior High School

Elementary schools
Suko Elementary School
Rokkaku Elementary School
Shiroishi Elementary School
Hokumei Elementary School
Fukudomi Elementary School
Ariake East Elementary School
Ariake West Elementary School
Ariake South Elementary School

Transportation

Air
The closest airports are Saga Airport and Fukuoka Airport.

Rail
JR Kyūshū
Nagasaki Main Line
Hizen-Shiroishi and Hizen-Ryūō

Roads
National Highways: Route 207 and Route 444. 
Prefectural Roads: Saga Prefecture Route 36

Festivals
, July 13 - Floats are pulled down the main shopping district in the tradition of the Kyoto Gion Festival.
, October 1 - A fall festival celebrating the sea at Kaidou Shrine.
, October 19 - This fall festival is held at the Tsumayama, Rokkaku, Inasa, and Fukudomi shrines. It features Japanese horseback archery, called yabusame.
, December 26 - A bonfire festival where people pray for the coming year.

Notable Places
, a park with many flowers.
 Suko Castle, A castle ruin in the Sengoku period. Ryūzōji Takanobu's residence.
, an old shrine in the mountains west of Shiroishi. Of particular note is the stone paved road leading to the shrine.
 a park and playground.

People from Shioishi
Ryosuke Kagawa
Ariake Kambara
Nabeshima Katsushige
Kazuhiro Maeda
Yoshiki Maeda
Nobuyoshi Mutō
Yorozu Oda
Hiroshi Ogushi
Ryosuke Shirahama
Ryūzōji Takanobu

References

External links

 Shiroishi official website

Towns in Saga Prefecture